Alpherakya is a Palearctic genus of butterflies in the family Lycaenidae.

Species
Listed alphabetically:

 Alpherakya devanica (Moore, [1875])
 Alpherakya pilgram (Bálint & Johnson, 1997) Central Asia
 Alpherakya sarta (Alphéraky, 1881)
 Alpherakya sartoides (Swinhoe, 1910) Darvaz, Alai, Pamirs, Afghanistan, Pakistan, North India.

References

External links

Polyommatini
Lycaenidae genera